Pedro Abelino Aguirre Cerda (February 6, 1879 – November 25, 1941) was a Chilean political figure, educator, and lawyer who served as the 22nd president of Chile from 1938 until his death in 1941. A member of the Radical Party since 1906, he was chosen by the left-wing Popular Front coalition as its candidate for the 1938 presidential election and won. He had previously served as deputy for San Felipe, Putaendo and Los Andes from 1915 to 1918, Minister of the Interior from January to September 1918 under president Juan Luis Sanfuentes, deputy for Santiago from 1918 to 1921, Minister of Justice and Public Instruction from 1920 to 1921 under president Arturo Alessandri, and senator for Concepción from 1921 to 1927. He died two years and eleven months into his presidency on November 25, 1941, at the age of 62, from tuberculosis.



Early life
Pedro Aguirre Cerda was born on February 6, 1879, in Pocuro, a small village near the city of Los Andes, Chile. He was the seventh of eleven children born to parents Juan Bautista Aguirre Campos and Clarisa Cerda Escudero. His father, a farmer, died in 1887 when he was eight years old, leaving his widowed mother to run the farm and raise the eleven children on her own. His family was of Basque descent.

He completed his initial tertiary studies at the Pedagogical Institute of the University of Chile in Santiago, becoming a Spanish teacher. He continued his studies at the university's Faculty of Law, becoming a lawyer in 1904. In 1910, he received a government grant to study administrative and financial law at the Sorbonne in Paris and political economy and social legislation at the Collège de France. He returned to Chile in 1914 and took a position as a teacher at the Instituto Nacional and was elected as president of the National Society of Teachers. In 1916, he married his first cousin Juana Rosa Aguirre Luco, with whom he had no children.

He was a very distinguished teacher, attorney, deputy and senator. He was also the first dean of the new school of economy of the University of Chile. As a member of the Radical Party, he was minister of Public Instruction and of the Interior during the administrations of Juan Luis Sanfuentes and Arturo Alessandri. During the period of military domination, he was persecuted and became an active opposition leader to the government of General Carlos Ibáñez del Campo.

He was chosen by the Popular Front coalition of left-wing parties and trade unions as its candidate in the 1938 Chilean presidential election, where he narrowly defeated right-wing candidate  of the Liberal-Conservative coalition by 4,111 votes.

Presidency

Aguirre Cerda assumed his duties as president on December 25, 1938, under the slogan "Gobernar es educar" (to govern is to educate). As a teacher, his priority in government was education. As such, he promoted the development of the technical-industrial schools as a means to promote the formation of technicians for the nascent industrialization of the country. He also created thousands of new regular schools and encouraged the growth of the university system to cover the whole of the country. Aguirre's government also redistributed some land, encouraged the formation of agricultural settlements, built low-cost housing and schools, and integrated the Marxist parties into the political system.

During his first year he had to face military opposition to his plans, which boiled over with the so-called Ariostazo. He also promoted and campaigned for a Nobel prize for Gabriela Mistral, which only came to fruition under his successor, Juan Antonio Ríos.

On the economic side, and prompted in part by the devastating earthquake of 1939, he created the Production Development Corporation (Corporación de Fomento de la Producción - CORFO) to encourage with subsidies and direct investments an ambitious program of import substitution industrialization. This was the basis for the industrialization of Chile. From there sprung the steel, manufacturing and sugar industries.

In 1941, due to his rapidly escalating illness, he appointed his Minister of the Interior Jerónimo Méndez as vice-president to succeed him. He died soon after on November 25, 1941, in Santiago, Chile, from tuberculosis. Méndez served as acting president until Juan Antonio Rios, elected on February 1, 1942, took office on April 2.

Legacy

In the Chilean Antarctic Expedition in 1950–51, the explorers named the Aguirre Passage between Lemaire Island and Danco Coast  after Don Pedro Aguirre Cerda.

Salvador Allende, one of Aguirre Cerda's close associates and Minister of Health under his presidency, would become president in 1970.

See also
Economic history of Chile
Ariostazo

References

External links
TIME article on the political scene during President Aguirre's first year in power

1879 births
1941 deaths
People from Los Andes Province, Chile
Chilean people of Basque descent
Radical Party of Chile politicians
Presidents of Chile
Government ministers of Chile
Deputies of the XXXI Legislative Period of the National Congress of Chile
Deputies of the XXXII Legislative Period of the National Congress of Chile
Senators of the XXXIII Legislative Period of the National Congress of Chile
Candidates for President of Chile
Chilean Freemasons
University of Chile alumni
Instituto Nacional General José Miguel Carrera alumni
20th-century deaths from tuberculosis
Tuberculosis deaths in Chile